Bernac is a commune in the Tarn département in southern France. It has 189 inhabitants in 2013.

See also
Communes of the Tarn department

References

Communes of Tarn (department)